Rogelio Alfredo Chávez Martínez (born 28 October 1984) is a Mexican former professional footballer. He was awarded a Balón de Oro of best side defender while playing for Cruz Azul in the Clausura 2009.

He also known for his dangerous crosses and free kicks.

Career
On 25 July 2016, Chávez signed a one-year contract and was presented with Peruvian team FBC Melgar.

Chávez joined Arka Gdynia in Poland on 1 January 2019, after signing with the club on 28 November 2018.

Balon de Oro for Best Full back of the tournament: Primera División de México Apertura 2009

HonoursCruz Azul'
 CONCACAF Champions League: 2013–14

References

External links

Profile at Guardian Stats centre

1984 births
Living people
Footballers from Hidalgo (state)
Association football defenders
Mexico international footballers
Cruz Azul footballers
C.F. Pachuca players
Atlas F.C. footballers
FBC Melgar footballers
Arka Gdynia players
Ekstraklasa players
Liga MX players
Mexican expatriate footballers
Expatriate footballers in Peru
Expatriate footballers in Poland
Mexican expatriate sportspeople in Peru
Mexican expatriate sportspeople in Poland
Mexican footballers